Stol is a village situated in Babušnica municipality in Serbia.

References

Populated places in Pirot District